You're Too Straight To Love Me is the fourth studio album released by Oh My God.

Track listing
 "This Is... the Worst... Oater... Ever!" -  2:39
 "You're Too Straight to Love Me" - 3:56 
 "Effortless" - 4:22 
 "This December" - 4:46 
 "My Life Is a Warfare" - 4:21
 "The Sneak" - 2:57 
 "The '60s" - 2:47 
 "This Is... the Worst... Oater... Ever!" (Hoppy's Version) - 3:09

Personnel 

Billy O'Neill – vocals, bass
Ig – organ, vocals
Danny Yost – drums
Zach Verdoorne – bass, guitar, vocals

2004 albums
Oh My God (band) albums